Podborny is a rural locality (a settlement) and the administrative center of Podborny Selsoviet, Krutikhinsky District, Altai Krai, Russia. The population was 396 as of 2013. There are 4 streets.

Geography 
Podborny is located 18 km northwest of Krutikha (the district's administrative centre) by road. Krasnoryazhsky is the nearest rural locality.

References 

Rural localities in Krutikhinsky District